Sha Lek Highway, opened on 26 June 1991, is a section of expressway in Sha Tin District, New Territories, Hong Kong. It runs 1.5 km from Tate's Cairn Highway in Siu Lek Yuen to Sha Tin Road and Sha Tin Wai Road and has a speed limit of 80 km/h. It is one of the only three expressways in Hong Kong not assigned to any numbered highway system (the others being Penny's Bay Highway and Hong Kong Link Road).

Interchanges

See also
List of streets and roads in Hong Kong

References

Roads in the New Territories
Sha Tin
Viaducts in Hong Kong